The Hitman's Bodyguard is a 2017 American action comedy film directed by Patrick Hughes and starring Ryan Reynolds, Samuel L. Jackson, Gary Oldman, and Salma Hayek. The film follows a bodyguard (Reynolds) who must protect a convicted hitman (Jackson), who is on his way to testify at the International Criminal Court against a sadistic, Eastern European dictator (Oldman).

The Hitman's Bodyguard was released in the United States on August 18, 2017, and grossed $183 million worldwide. Critics praised the performances and chemistry of Reynolds and Jackson and the action sequences, but criticized the clichéd plot and execution. A sequel, Hitman's Wife's Bodyguard, was released on June 16, 2021.

Plot 
Michael Bryce lives a luxurious life as a successful UK-based private bodyguard, until his client Takashi Kurosawa, an international arms dealer, is assassinated on his watch. Two years later, the fallen-from-grace Bryce survives by protecting drug-addicted corporate executives in London.

Meanwhile, Vladislav Dukhovich, the vicious dictator of Belarus, is on trial for crimes against humanity at the International Criminal Court. Unable to secure solid evidence or testimony against him, the prosecution's last hope is incarcerated hitman Darius Kincaid, who agrees to testify against Dukhovich in exchange for the release of his wife Sonia from prison. Led by Interpol Agent Roussel, an armed convoy escorts Kincaid from the UK to the International Criminal Court in The Hague.

With the aid of treacherous Interpol Assistant Director Jean Foucher, Dukhovich's men successfully ambush the convoy as it passes through Coventry and kill most of the security team. Kincaid eliminates the attackers and Agent Roussel, the sole survivor, takes Kincaid to an Interpol safehouse in the city. Realizing that the agency cannot be entrusted with the mission due to a possible leak, she enlists the help of Bryce, her ex, to escort and protect Kincaid on the way to The Hague.

They hitchhike to a ferry going to Amsterdam, where Sonia is being held. Kincaid reveals to Bryce that he was the one who killed Kurosawa, having spotted him by chance while on another job, causing an outraged Bryce to abandon him. As Bryce evaluates his past mistakes at a beer stand, Dukhovich's men attack Kincaid. Bryce regains his composure and helps Kincaid escape, but is captured in the process. As he's being tortured, Kincaid arrives and rescues Bryce.

After reconciling their differences, they arrive at The Hague with seconds to spare. Kincaid testifies that Dukhovich hired him to assassinate a political rival, but Kincaid witnessed Dukhovich carry out a mass execution, and uploaded the massacre photos to a secret FTP site that he provides to the court.

Dukhovich admits guilt, then resorts to his backup plan: bombing the court to escape. Foucher leaves the court before the bombing and Roussel deduces he was the traitor. In the confusion after the bomb goes off, Dukhovich seizes a gun to kill Kincaid, but Bryce dives in front of the bullet, taking the hit. Injured, he tells Kincaid to stop Dukhovich. 

Foucher and Roussel struggle until Bryce shoots him to save Roussel. Kincaid pursues Dukhovich to the roof where he attempts to escape by helicopter his men hijacked. Kincaid destroys the helicopter and angrily kicks Dukhovich off the roof to his death for shooting Bryce.

Kincaid is rearrested for his various crimes but breaks out of Belmarsh Prison several months later so he and Sonia can celebrate their anniversary in the bar in Honduras where they first met. As a wild bar brawl breaks out around them, they kiss.

Cast 
 Ryan Reynolds as Michael Bryce, a disgraced triple A rated executive protection agent and CIA officer.
 Samuel L. Jackson as Darius Kincaid, a foul mouthed, infamous hitmam and Sonia's husband.
 Gary Oldman as Vladislav Dukhovich, the dictatorial President of Belarus.
 Salma Hayek as Sonia Kincaid, Darius's wife.
 Élodie Yung as Amelia Roussel, an Interpol agent and Michael's ex-girlfriend.
 Joaquim de Almeida as Jean Foucher, the French Assistant Director of Interpol and traitor.
 Barry Atsma as Moreno, the lead prosecution lawyer.
 Tine Joustra as Renata Casoria, Director of Interpol.
 Kirsty Mitchell as Rebecca Harr, Kincaid's lawyer.
 Sam Hazeldine as Garrett, a National Crime Agency officer.
 Mikhail Gorevoy as Litvin, Dukhovich's lead defense lawyer.
 Richard E. Grant as Mr. Seifert, a drug addicted corporate executive and client of Bryce.
 Yuri Kolokolnikov as Ivan, Dukhovich's lead mercenary.
 Georgie Glen as ICC Lead Judge
 Patrick Hughes as Interpol Agent

Production 
In May 2011, David Ellison's Skydance Media acquired the action script The Hitman's Bodyguard written by Tom O'Connor. The script was among the top 2011 Black List of unproduced screenplays. While originally intended as a drama, the script underwent a "frantic" two-week rewrite to be remade into a comedy several weeks prior to filming.

On November 4, 2015, Ryan Reynolds, Samuel L. Jackson and Gary Oldman were cast in the film, which Jeff Wadlow would direct for Millennium Films. Producers would be Mark Gill, John Thompson, Matt O'Toole and Les Weldon. On February 23, 2016, Élodie Yung and Salma Hayek were cast in the film, which Lionsgate would distribute in the United States. On March 9, 2016, it was reported that Wadlow had exited the film and Patrick Hughes signed on to direct the film.

Principal photography began on April 2, 2016 in London, Amsterdam and Sofia.
Originally, just one scene was to be shot in Amsterdam but when Hughes visited the location and saw its surroundings he decided to move some "London scenes" to the old inner city of Amsterdam. The Coventry-based scenes were also filmed in London.

Reception

Box office
The Hitman's Bodyguard grossed $75.5 million in the United States and Canada and $107.9 million in other territories for a worldwide total of $176.6 million, against a production budget between $30–69 million.

In North America, The Hitman's Bodyguard was released on August 18, 2017 and was projected to gross $17–20 million from 3,350 theaters in its opening weekend. The film made $8 million on its first day (including $1.65 million from Thursday night previews). It went on to open to $21.4 million, topping the box office. In its second weekend the film made $10.3 million, finishing first at the box office in what was the combined lowest-grossing weekend since September 2001. The film made another $10.5 million the following weekend, becoming the third film of 2017 to finish atop the box office for three straight weeks. However, while it made an estimated $12.9 million over the four-day Labor Day weekend, was again involved in a historically low weekend, as it was the worst combined holiday weekend since 1998.

Critical response
On review aggregator website Rotten Tomatoes, the film holds an approval rating of 43% based on 226 reviews, and an average rating of 5.2/10. The site's critical consensus reads, "The Hitman's Bodyguard coasts on Samuel L. Jackson and Ryan Reynolds' banter—but doesn't get enough mileage to power past an overabundance of action-comedy clichés." On Metacritic, which assigns a normalized rating to reviews, the film has a weighted average score 47 out of 100, based on 42 reviews, indicating "mixed or average reviews". Audiences polled by CinemaScore gave the film an average grade of "B+" on an A+ to F scale, while PostTrak reported filmgoers gave it an 80% overall positive score and a 57% "definite recommend".

Peter Debruge of Variety gave the film a positive review and called it a pleasant late-summer surprise, writing: "The Hitman's Bodyguard is about as close to a live-action cartoon as you're likely to get this year... That's not a style that works much of the time... but in the hands of The Expendables 3 helmer Patrick Hughes—and more importantly, owing to the chemistry of stars Samuel L. Jackson and Ryan Reynolds—it makes for a delightfully ridiculous screwball action comedy." Writing for Rolling Stone, Peter Travers praised the cast, giving it 2.5 stars out of 4 and saying, "Reynolds and Jackson make this summer lunacy go down easy with their banter and bullet-dodging skills. They're the only reason that The Hitman's Bodyguard doesn't completely sink into the generic quicksand from whence it came."

Sequel

In May 2018, it was announced that Reynolds, Jackson and Hayek were in early talks to reprise their roles for a sequel, titled Hitman's Wife's Bodyguard, with plans to begin filming later in the year. Production on the sequel began in March 2019, with Frank Grillo, Antonio Banderas, and Morgan Freeman joining the cast of the film.

References

External links 
 
 
 

2017 films
2017 action thriller films
2017 action comedy films
American action comedy films
American action thriller films
American buddy action films
American buddy comedy films
American chase films
American comedy thriller films
2010s buddy comedy films
American courtroom films
2010s English-language films
Films about bodyguards
Films about contract killing
Films about Interpol
Films directed by Patrick Hughes
Films scored by Atli Örvarsson
Films set in Amsterdam
Films set in London
Films set in The Hague
Films shot in Amsterdam
Films shot in Bulgaria
Films shot in London
Lionsgate films
2017 comedy films
2010s American films